Nosowo , (formerly ) is a village in the administrative district of Gmina Suchań, within Stargard County, West Pomeranian Voivodeship, in north-western Poland.

For the history of the region, see History of Pomerania.

Notable residents
 David Hollatz (writer) (died 14 June 1771), German Lutheran ministerm

References

Nosowo